Sir Guillaume I de Coucy (died 1335), Lord of Coucy, Oisy, La Fère, Marle and Montmirail was a French nobleman.

Biography
Guillaume was the son of Enguerrand V de Coucy and Christine de Lindsay.

Marriage and issue
He married secondly Isabelle, daughter of Guy IV de Chatillon and Marie de Bretagne, they are known to have had the following known issue.

Enguerrand VI de Coucy (died 25 August 1346), Lord of Coucy, Marle, La Fère, Oisy and Montmirail, married Katharine of Austria, had issue.
William II de Coucy (died 6 February 1342), Lord of Wyresdale, Lancashire and other lands in England, married Joan de Strother, died without issue.
Jean de Coucy (died c.1357), Lord of Havrincourt, without issue.
Raoul de Coucy (died 1389), Lord of Montmirail, La Ferté-Gaucher, Encre and Bailleul, married Jeanne de Harcourt, had issue.
Aubert de Coucy, Lord of Drosnay, Droizy and Romeny, married Jeanne de Villesavoir, had issue.
Guy de Coucy, died without issue.
Jeanne de Coucy, married Gaucher de Chatillon, Vicomte de Blaigny; had issue:
 Marie de Chatillon, Vicountess of Blaigny, married Henry of Orbe; had:
 Henriette, Countess of Montbéliard, married Eberhard IV, Count of Württemberg
Marguerite de Coucy
Catherine de Coucy
Marie de Coucy
Isabelle de Coucy

Notes

Citations

References

1288 births
1335 deaths
14th-century French people
French soldiers
People of the Hundred Years' War
Place of birth missing
Lords of France